Hero Honda - Sa Re Ga Ma Pa Challenge 2009 is the 3rd installment of the Sa Re Ga Ma Pa Challenge series which premiered on 4 July 2008 on Zee TV. The show is hosted by Aditya Narayan, who also hosted the previous competition Sa Re Ga Ma Pa Challenge 2007. This show features two new mentors, Shankar Mahadevan and Pritam, who join Himesh Reshammiya, who was a judge in the previous edition. Aadesh Shrivastava returns as a judge for this show as he was also a judge in Sa Re Ga Ma Pa Challenge 2005.

Chakravyuh
Chakravyuh is the name that represents the preliminary rounds of the contest. The idea is to have every contestant perform in front of a 'Mahaguru' and try for a qualification to round two of the contest. contest vocal test by Milind Dabholkar (Organ-Synthesizer player)

Every week, two contestants from each Gharana were selected to perform in front of the judges and the 'Mahaguru'. Considering that there are four Gharanas, total of eight contestants perform in the first episode of the week. Out of the eight contestants, the top two singers, judged by the 'Mahaguru', qualify for the next round of the competition. The remaining six contestants are then asked to perform again in the second episode of the week, out of which the bottom two contestants are eliminated from the show. The remaining four then advance to the next round.

Sanjeevini Booti
'Sanjeevini Booti' is the name used as 'lifeline' in the show. It means that the judges have authority to offer another chance to an eliminated contestant. Only one lifeline will be offered in a week to one of the two eliminated contestants. All the contestants will then have to perform again and only one of them will be selected for the next round.

Round 1

The following contestants got 'Sanjeevini Booti' in the first round of the competition.
 Rashi Ragshree (Dhoom): Week 2 - Eliminated (26 July; Episode 8)
 Shashi Sumon (Jai Ho): Week 3 - Eliminated (29 August; Episode 17)
 Jeffrey Iqbal (Lakshya): Week 4 - Eliminated (26 July; Episode 8)

All three contestants performed in week 4 and Shashi Suman from Jai Ho gharana got selected for second round of the competition.

Round 2

The following contestants got 'Sanjeevini Booti' in the second round of the competition.
 Faraz Butt (Jai Ho): Week 5
 Tarun Sagar (Lakshya): Week 6 Eliminated (22 August; Episode 15)
 Sayon Chaudhary (Jai Ho): Week 7 Eliminated (23 August; Episode 16)

Results

Ekalavya Gharana

References

Sa Re Ga Ma Pa
2009 Indian television seasons
Zee TV original programming